Johann Joachim Lange (26 October 1670 – 7 May 1744) was a German Protestant theologian and philosopher.

Lange was born in Gardelegen and educated in Leipzig, Erfurt and Halle. He was influenced by Christian Thomasius and the pietist August Hermann Francke. He became a professor of theology at Halle in 1709, and opposed the philosophy of Christian Wolff. He died in Halle on 7 May 1744.

Lange wrote the hymn O God, what offering shall I give?, translated into English by John Wesley in 1739.

Lange's son, Samuel Gotthold Lange, was a noted poet.

Works
Medicina mentis, 1704
Causa dei et religionis naturalis adversum atheismus, 1723
Modesta Disqvisitio Novi Philosophiæ Systematis De Deo, Mvndo Et Homine, Et Præsertim De Harmonia Commercii Inter Animam Et Corpvs Præstabilita; Cvm Epicrisi In Viri Cvivsdam Clarissimi Commentationem ; De Differentia Nexvs Rervm Sapientis Et Fatalis Necessitatis, Nec Non Systematis Harmoniæ ..., 1723

References

1670 births
1744 deaths
People from Gardelegen
German Lutheran theologians
German philosophers
German male non-fiction writers
Writers from Saxony-Anhalt
18th-century German Protestant theologians
18th-century German male writers